Diderik Iversen Tønseth (24 September 1818 – 12 January 1893) was a Norwegian politician for the Liberal Party.

He was elected to the Norwegian Parliament in 1862, representing the constituency of Søndre Trondhjems Amt. He worked as a teacher there. He was later elected in 1868, 1871, 1874, 1877, 1880 and 1883.

References

1818 births
1893 deaths
Members of the Storting
Liberal Party (Norway) politicians
Sør-Trøndelag politicians
People from Røros